Peter Siddqiue (born 1977) is an Indian football player. He is currently playing for Mumbai FC in the I-League in India as a defender.

External links
 goal.com
 

Indian footballers
1977 births
Living people
Mumbai FC players
Association football defenders
Footballers from Mumbai